Klenovnik may refer to:

 Klenovnik, Croatia, a village and municipality in Croatia
 Klenovnik, Požarevac, a village in Požarevac, Serbia